Karuna Banerjee (25 December 1919 – 13 November 2001) was a Bengali actress best known for her role in Satyajit Ray's The Apu Trilogy (1955–1959) as the long suffering mother, Sarbajaya. She was nominated for Best Actress at the 1959 BAFTA Awards for her performance in Aparajito (1956), the second part of The Apu Trilogy. She appeared in a number of other films after that, including Ray's Devi (1960) and Kanchenjungha (1962).

Early life
She graduated from the Jogamaya Devi College, an affiliated women's college of the University of Calcutta.

Acting career
Banerjee's acting career expanded over more than two decades in Bengali cinema and theatre. She is best known for her memorable performance as Sarbajaya, the mother in the first two parts of Satyajit Ray's The Apu Trilogy: Pather Panchali (1955) and Aparajito (1956). Her performance in the latter earned her a Best Actress nomination at the 1959 BAFTA Awards. She acted in a few more films, including two more by Ray, two by Mrinal Sen, and one by Ritwik Ghatak that was never officially released.

Filmography

 Pather Panchali (1955), directed by Satyajit Ray
 Aparajito (1956), directed by Satyajit Ray
 Headmaster (1959), directed by Agragami
 Shubha Bibaha (1959), directed by Sombhu Mitra and Amit Maitra
 Kato Ajanare (1959), directed by Ritwik Ghatak
 Devi (1960), directed by Satyajit Ray
 Kanchenjungha (1962), directed by Satyajit Ray
 To Light a Candle, directed by Shanti P. Chowdhury
 Interview (1971), directed by Mrinal Sen

References

Further reading
Satyajit Ray, the filmmaker, the book of the films, The Apu Trilogy
Karuna Banerjee's collection of writings were published as a book, entitled An Actress in Her Time (A Celluloid Chapter Persona Series) in English and in Bengali.
Sarbajaya:  Selected Writings of Karuna Banerjee

External links
 
 সর্বংসহা, সর্বজয়া করুণা বন্দ্যোপাধ্যায় Anandabazar
 Page from Lovefilm.com

Actresses in Bengali cinema
20th-century Bengalis
21st-century Bengalis
20th-century Indian actresses 
Bengali actresses 
1919 births
2001 deaths
Jogamaya Devi College alumni
University of Calcutta alumni
Indian film actresses